Deletraz or Delétraz is a surname, and may refer to;

Jean-Denis Délétraz (born 1963) - a Swiss racing driver.
Louis Delétraz (born 1997) - a Swiss racing driver.

References

External links
Distribution of the surname Deletraz in France

Franco-Provençal-language surnames